Satyendra Kappu (born Satyendra Sharma; also credited as Satyen Kappu; 7 February 1931 – 27 October 2007), was an Indian character actor in Bollywood films. He has acted in 390 films. His most remembered role is Ramlal in the movie Sholay (1975) and as Amitabh Bachchan's father in Yash Chopra's Deewaar. His other notable films are Kati Patang, Anuraag, Amar Prem, Yaadon Ki Baraat, Khote Sikkay, Don, Chhoti Bahu, Benaam, Zanjeer, Avishkaar,  Majboor, Namak Halaal, Kaala Patthar, Angaaray, Mr. Natwarlal, Red Rose, Naya Kadam and Aaj Ka M.L.A. Ram Avtar.

Career
Satyen Kappu started his career as a stage actor in 1952 with the Indian People's Theatre Association (IPTA) in Bombay (present-day Mumbai). His career spanned from the early 1960s to the early 2000s with over 390 films to his credit. He mostly played supporting roles of a father, relative, uncle, police officer, doctor and villainous roles. His work in many films with Rajesh Khanna, Amitabh Bachchan, Jeetendra, Mithun Chakraborty in the lead were noteworthy.

He was a resident of Sunder Nagar, Mumbai. He died on 27 October 2007 in Mumbai following a cardiac arrest at the age of 76.

Filmography

Television

References

External links
 
 Satyen Kappu Filmography Bollywood Hungama

1931 births
2007 deaths
Male actors in Hindi cinema
Indian male film actors
People from Panipat